Trevor Thomas is a British actor. He acted mostly around the late 1970s mostly in television programmes, but also starred in the 1977 film Black Joy, alongside Norman Beaton, as well as in stage productions. Thomas's other film credits include Yesterday's Hero (1979), A Hole In Babylon (1979), Inseminoid (1981), Sheena (1984), Underworld (1985), Playing Away (1987) and The Nine Lives of Tomas Katz (2000). His television appearances include Space: 1999 (1976), The Fosters ("Take Your Partners", 1977), The Professionals ("Klansmen", 1977), Rockliffe's Babies ("Sweet and Sour Revenge", 1987), Silent Witness ("The World Cruise", 2000), Minder ("Gunfight at the O.K. Laundrette", 1979, and "Fiddler on the Hoof", 1989) and The Sweeney ("The Bigger They Are", 1978).

References

External links

British male film actors
British male television actors
Living people
Black British male actors
20th-century British male actors
British people of Jamaican descent
Year of birth missing (living people)